Phyllium jacobsoni is a species of leaf insect belonging to the family Phylliidae. Its recorded distribution is Java and no subspecies are listed in the Catalogue of Life.

References

External links

 Phasmida Species File. Brock P.

Phylliidae
Insects described in 1934
Phasmatodea of Malesia